Tay Head is a rocky headland  east of Mount Alexander, extending into the Firth of Tay on the south coast of Joinville Island. The name, given by the United Kingdom Antarctic Place-Names Committee (UK-APC) in 1963, is derived from the Firth of Tay in Scotland.

Geography 
Tay Head is pebble spit or tombolo jutting southward from Joinville Island.  The parallel gravel bars are a result of post-glacial (isostatic) uplift of the area after the much larger Pleistocene ice cap melted and the pressure was released. 

Headlands of the Joinville Island group